Fox Sports is a group of channels available in Latin American and operated by The Walt Disney Company Latin America, a unit of the Disney International Operations. The network is focused on sports-related programming including live and pre-recorded event broadcasts, sports talk shows and original programming, available throughout Latin America.

History

The network was launched in 1996 as Prime Deportiva, under the ownership of Liberty Media. Prior to its launch, on October 31, 1995, News Corporation acquired a 50% ownership interest in Liberty's Prime Network group and its international networks (including sister channels Premier Sports and Prime Sports Asia) as part of an expansion of its Fox Sports properties in the Americas. In 1996, the channel was rebranded as Fox Sports Américas, later shortened to Fox Sports in 1999. In 2002, Hicks, Muse, Tate and Furst, a Dallas private equity firm, Liberty Media Corp and News Corp created a holding company (Fox Pan American Sports) to jointly operate FOX Sports Latin America. News Corp owned approximately 38% interest. Liberty later exited leaving HMTF and News Corp as co-owners of the cable network. News Corp purchased the ownership rights from HMTF of FOX Sports en Espanol and rebranded as FOX Deportes in 2010. News Corp purchased the remaining ownership rights for the holding company from HMTF and fully owned the FOX Sports Latin America cable network in 2011.

In 2009, a second feed called Fox Sports+ (FOX Sports mas) was launched, to allow simultaneous broadcasting of football. In 2010, FOX Sports signed a deal with UFC to be the first cable network to show it in Latin America. FOX Sports also opened a studio in 2010 in Mexico City where it broadcasts original programming and licensed programming. In 2012, the channel was renamed to Fox Sports 2, whereas Speed Channel was rebranded to Fox Sports 3.

In March 2019, the network became a subsidiary of The Walt Disney Company after it acquired 21st Century Fox.

In December 2019, it was announced that its Chilean, Peruvian, Uruguayan and Colombian channels would go off the air.

In November 2021, Disney announced that Fox Sports' main channel would be renamed ESPN 4 on December 1, 2021, while Fox Sports 2 and Fox Sports 3 would continue on the air with the premium channel (Fox Sports 1) in Chile continuing on the air as well.

Feeds

Fox Sports 
 Fox Sports 1 (Chile) — formerly known as Fox Sports Premium, it was launched at the same time as its sister channel. It covered pay-TV events from Fox Sports and Fox Sports 2 that couldn't be aired live on the localized feed due to broadcast licenses.

Fox Sports 2
North feed: available in Central America and Dominican Republic
South feed: available in South America

Fox Sports 3
Panregional feed: available in Central America, Dominican Republic and South America

Localised channels (closed in 2019)
 Fox Sports (Chile) — localized feed exclusively available for Chile, replacing Fox Sports in November 2013. 
 Fox Sports (Colombia) — localized channel launched in 2016 as an independent feed with original programming.
 Fox Sports (Peru) - localised channel launched on 1 March 2018, with exclusive voice-over narrations for matches involving Peruvian football clubs and the Peruvian football team.
 Fox Sports (Uruguay) - localised channel launched in February 2014 with original programming and voice-over narrations for Uruguayan football teams.

Programming
Fox Sports Latin America broadcast sports-related programming 24 hours a day in Spanish. The network carried a wide variety of sports events, including football (UEFA Champions League, Copa Lib, etc.), MLB and WWE programming. Fox Sports also aired talk shows (NET: Nunca es tarde) as well as other programming including exercise programs.

Sports programming

Football
 National Football League – Sunday afternoon games

Football
 Copa Libertadores (Only for South America)

Motorsport
 World Rally Championship
 Dakar Rally
 Porsche Supercup
 WeatherTech SportsCar Championship
 FIA World Endurance Championship 
 Superbike World Championship

Professional Wrestling
 WWE (Raw and SmackDown)

Other programming
Alongside its live sports broadcasts, Fox Sports also aired a variety of sports highlight, talk, and documentary styled shows. These include:

Personalities 

  Damián Trillini
  Daniel Retamozo
  Juan Manuel Pons
  Julián Fernández 
  Martín Ponte
  Matias Sanchez
  Mauricio Gallardo
   Pablo Pons 
  Pablo Schillaci
  Raúl Barceló
  Sebastián Porto

See also
 Fox Sports International
 Fox Sports (Argentina)
 Fox Sports (Brazil)
 Fox Sports (Mexico)
 GOL TV 
 ESPN Latin America
 TyC Sports
 TUDN
 DirecTV Sports 
 Claro Sports

References

Latin American cable television networks
Latin America
Television channels and stations established in 1996
Television channels and stations disestablished in 2021
Spanish-language television stations
Companies based in Los Angeles
Prime Sports
The Walt Disney Company Latin America